(born August 5, 1972) is a Japanese professional wrestler, currently performing for Pro Wrestling Noah (Noah). Hidaka was the regular partner of Minoru Fujita, with whom he has held the Zero1-Max International Lightweight Tag Team and Intercontinental Tag Team Titles, making them the only team to do so. He has also worked for Extreme Championship Wrestling (ECW).

Professional wrestling career

Battlarts (1997–2001)
Hidaka debuted for the Battlarts shoot style promotion in 1997 after training in the Animal Hamaguchi Dojo. He spent his rookie year venturing to promotions like Michinoku Pro Wrestling (Michinoku Pro) and Kingdom Pro Wrestling (KPW), sharing rings with names like Yuki Ishikawa, Daisuke Ikeda, Minoru Tanaka and Yoshihiro Tajiri. In 1998, he challenged for the vacated UWA World Middleweight Championship, but was defeated by Willow. Shortly after, he formed a tag team with Minoru Fujita, who was based in Big Japan Pro Wrestling (BJW), and they competed at the Tag League 98, where they managed to snatch a significant win over Masao Orihara and Takeshi Ono. They would team extensively in several promotions, but over time, conflicting schedules from competing for separate promotions limited their activity as a team.

In November 1999, after several months wrestling for Battlarts alone, Hidaka was sent to America as a Battlarts representative for a learning excursion in Extreme Championship Wrestling (ECW). He competed mainly in cruiserweight matches against Yoshihiro Tajiri and Super Crazy, as well as Super Calo. His tenure was notable for commentator Joel Gertner constantly making racist remarks about Hidaka during his matches and nicknamed him "Pokémon" after the popular children's animated series. In 2000, Hidaka returned to Japan, now somewhat higher on the scale, and wrestled numerous matches for Battlarts with Mitsuya Nagai as his tag team partner. He wrestled for the promotion until its very end in late 2001.

Michinoku Pro Wrestling (2001)
After Battlarts collapsed, Hidaka wandered in the Japanese independent circuit. He entered Michinoku Pro Wrestling (Michinoku Pro) and won a tournament for the vacant FMW Independent World Junior Heavyweight Championship, upsetting New Japan Pro-Wrestling star El Samurai in the final - his first great solo victory. He made an alliance with Dick Togo, styling himself as Togo's disciple and joining him in the Far East Connection stable. As Togo and Michinoku Pro owner The Great Sasuke bickered over problems that had once caused Togo to leave the promotion before, the team left the promotion for Pro Wrestling Zero-One (Zero-One).

Pro Wrestling Zero-One/Zero1 (2001–2020)
In 2001, Hidaka entered Pro Wrestling Zero1 (Zero1) and began to battle the active junior heavyweight roster. For a while they were successful, winning the NWA International Lightweight Tag Team title once, but as Togo wanted to keep on wrestling other independents, their team broke up just in time as Minoru Fujita was returning from an overseas excursion. Hidaka and Fujita formed a team known as Skull and Bones and became prominent in the ZERO-1MAX/independent scene, even winning Pro Wrestling Noah (Noah)'s GHC Junior Heavyweight Tag Team Championship. Following a crucial loss to Minoru Tanaka and Masaaki Mochizuki, another team long "defunct before it even started" due to scheduling conflicts, Hidaka and Fujita turned on each other. On January 19, Hidaka beat Fujita to win the AWA World Junior Heavyweight title for a second time. He lost the title to Mochizuki on January 23, 2008.

In 2002, Hidaka had his mixed martial arts debut for Deep as a Zero1 representative, pitted against his close friend Takafumi Ito. Although he lacked formal MMA training, he had some experience in shoot wrestling thanks to his time in Battlarts and routinely trained kickboxing under Satoshi Kobayashi and Naoyuki Taira, who cornered him for the fight. The slightly heavier and much more experienced Ito dominated the grappling exchanges, but Hidaka survived until the second round and held his own with some ankle lock attempts before losing by rear naked choke.

Other promotions
Hidaka once appeared with Togo and Christopher Daniels in a Major League Wrestling (MLW) match in the United States in 2002, one of his rare appearances abroad.

On March 13, 2010, Hidaka made his debut for American professional wrestling promotion Evolve Wrestling at Evolve 2: Hero vs. Hidaka, defeating Chris Hero in the main event of the evening.

Personal life 
Hidaka owns and works at a fitness center called FLENJI. The gym is located in the Suginami ward of Tokyo and employs fellow pro-wrestlers Munenori Sawa, Fuminori Abe and Towa Iwasaki.

Championships and accomplishments

Premier Wrestling Federation
PWF Unified Tag Team Championship (1 time) – with Minoru Fujita
Kohaku Wrestling Wars
UWA World Tag Team Championship (1 time) – with Menso-re Oyaji
Michinoku Pro Wrestling
Independent World Junior Heavyweight Championship (1 time)
Tohoku Tag Team Championship (1 time) – with Minoru Fujita
UWA World Tag Team Championship (1 time) – with Minoru Fujita
Pro Wrestling Noah
GHC Junior Heavyweight Tag Team Championship (1 time) – with Minoru Fujita
Pro Wrestling World-1
PWF Universal Tag Team Championship (1 time) – with Minoru Fujita
Pro Wrestling Zero1
NWA Intercontinental Tag Team Championship (2 times) – with Minoru Fujita (1) and Munenori Sawa (1)
NWA International Lightweight Tag Team Championship (7 times) – with Dick Togo (1), Minoru Fujita (1), Munenori Sawa (1), Takafumi Ito (1), Hayato Fujita (1), Takuya Sugawara (1) and Fuminori Abe (1)
NWA United National Heavyweight Championship (1 time)
ZERO1-MAX International Junior Heavyweight Championship (5 times)
Tenkaichi Jr. (2009, 2010, 2015)
Tokyo Sports
Best Tag Team Award (2005) - with Minoru Fujita

Mixed martial arts record

|-
| Loss
| align=center| 0-1
| Takafumi Ito
| Submission (rear naked choke)
| DEEP - 5th Impact
| 
| align=center| 2
| align=center| 1:54
| Tokyo, Japan
|

Notes

References

External links
 Official blog (Japanese)
 Zero1 profile

1972 births
Japanese male professional wrestlers
Living people
People from Shimane Prefecture
GHC Junior Heavyweight Tag Team Champions
Tohoku Tag Team Champions
UWA World Tag Team Champions
20th-century professional wrestlers
21st-century professional wrestlers